Siete Iglesias de Trabancos (English: Seven Churches of Trabancos) is a municipality in the province of Valladolid, Castile and León, Spain. According to the 2004 census (INE), the municipality has a population of 561 inhabitants.

References

Municipalities in the Province of Valladolid